Furrer is a German language topographic surname of Swiss origin, which means "cleft in the ground", derived from the Swiss word furre. Notable people with the surname include:

Amanda Furrer (born 1991), American rifle shooter 
Beat Furrer (born 1954), Austrian composer
Gaston Furrer (born 1945), Swiss ice hockey player 
Jonas Furrer (1805–1861), Swiss politician
Nadja Furrer (born 1998), Swiss footballer
Otto Furrer (1903–1951), Swiss alpine skier
Philippe Furrer (born 1985), Swiss ice hockey player
Reinhard Furrer (1940–1995), German scientist
Will Furrer (born 1968), American football player

See also
Fuhrman
Fuhrmann (disambiguation)

References

German-language surnames
Swiss-German surnames